Tennakoon Mudiyanselage Jayaratne, also known as T.M. Jayaratne (Sinhala:ටි.එම්.ජයරත්න) (born 13 April 1944) in Dodangoda, Sri Lanka is a popular Sri Lankan vocalist and a violinist.

He has received the Presidential Award of Sri Lanka in 1978, 1979, 1980 and 1987. In 2006 Jayaratne was awarded the best male singer award at the Raigam Tele Award Festival.

Life and career

Overview
Jayaratne studied at prestigious St.Anthony's College, Kandy and Maliyadeva College in Kurunegala.  He was drawn into singing by the head of the Folk and Research unit at the Broadcasting Corporation C.J.S. Kulathilaka who asked him to vocalise several Sinhala folk songs that included "Gana Thel Sadun" to be broadcast over the radio. He recorded his first song in 1970.

Jayaratne debuted as a playback singer with "Lahiru Dahasak" written by Sunil Ariyarathne and composed by Premasiri Khemadasa. In 1978 he released his first cassette Tharanga Volume - 01. At present, he has given his golden voice to 79 films. Among these films, Bambaru Awith of Dharmasena Pathiraja and Hansa Vilak of Dharmasiri Bandaranayake are considered as the best ever films in Sri Lankan history.

In 1980 Jayaratne dueted with Sunila Abeysekera on "Hemin Sare Piya Vida" for the movie Hansa Vilak. The song was written by Dharmasena Pathiraja with music by Premasiri Khemadasa and became a popular song in Sri Lanka. His duets with Neela Wickramasinghe also became hugely popular hits. Also he has composed music for some songs but he achieved fame as a talented vocalist.

Personal life
Jayaratne is married to Malini Jayaratne and has two children. His son Isuru Jayarathne is also a singer.

External links
T.M Jayarathna Lyrics
T.M Jayarathna Songs
T.M Jayarathna Albums

References

1944 births
Living people
20th-century Sri Lankan male singers
Alumni of Maliyadeva College
Sinhalese singers